"Ship to Wreck" is a song by English indie rock band Florence and the Machine from their third studio album, How Big, How Blue, How Beautiful (2015). It was released on 9 April 2015 as the album's second single. The track premiered on Huw Stephens' show on BBC Radio 1 on 8 April 2015 and the accompanying music video was released on 13 April, following the narrative of band's previous two videos of "What Kind of Man" and "St. Jude". The video was filmed in frontwoman Florence Welch's  London house.

"Ship to Wreck" was met with critical acclaim, with critics praising Welch's vocals, as well as the song's production. The song received nominations for Best Rock Video at the 2015 MTV Video Music Awards and Best Pop Duo/Group Performance at the 58th Annual Grammy Awards.

Composition 
"Ship to Wreck" is a folk rock, pop rock, and soft rock song that carries an "upbeat, bouncy sound", in contrast to the lyrics, which speak of self-destructive behaviour. The song almost did not make the cut for How Big, How Blue, How Beautiful, as producer Markus Dravs had disallowed Welch to write more songs about water, a recurring theme in the band's previous album, Ceremonials (2011), but she managed to include it. In a press release, Welch explained the meaning behind the song, saying: "I was thinking about my own self destructive side, and how you can make something only to tear it down, enjoy/destroy, create/devastate etc. When you're in that whirlwind, you often end up breaking the thing you love the most."

Critical reception 
Jason Lipshutz of Billboard included "Ship to Wreck" on its "Top 10 Songs of 2015 (So Far)" list in June 2015, stating, "Florence Welch may have reached a new peak with third album How Big, How Blue, How Beautiful—she's certainly never been more effective as a live performer, and 'Ship To Wreck' demonstrates that she's still growing as a pop songwriter. Everything comes together for Florence + The Machine on their latest single, as Welch's voice coils around the slender arrangement and squeezes hard on the chorus." Rolling Stone ranked "Ship to Wreck" at number 26 on its list of the "50 Best Songs of 2015". The song also reached number 40 on the annual Triple J Hottest 100 for 2015.

Commercial performance
As of July 2018, "Ship to Wreck" had shifted 279,000 units in the United Kingdom, including 17 million streams, and counting.

Credits and personnel
Credits adapted from the liner notes of How Big, How Blue, How Beautiful.

Recording
 Engineered at The Pool (London)
 Mixed at The Mixsuite (UK)
 Mastered at Sterling Sound (New York City)

Personnel
Florence and the Machine
 Florence Welch – vocals, backing vocals
 Chris Hayden – drums, percussion
 Rob Ackroyd – electric guitar

Additional personnel

 Markus Dravs – production, glockenspiel
 Kid Harpoon – production, drums, percussion, bass, electric guitar, CP70 synth
 Robin Baynton – engineering
 Jonathan Sagis – engineering assistance
 Iain Berryman – engineering assistance
 Leo Abrahams – acoustic guitar
 James Hallawell – Hammond organ
 Janelle Martin – backing vocals
 Nim Miller – backing vocals
 Baby N'Sola – backing vocals
 Mark "Spike" Stent – mixing
 Geoff Swan – mixing assistance
 Ted Jensen – mastering

Charts

Weekly charts

Year-end charts

Certifications

Release history

References

2015 singles
2015 songs
Florence and the Machine songs
Island Records singles
Music videos shot in London
Republic Records singles
Song recordings produced by Markus Dravs
Songs written by Florence Welch
Songs written by Kid Harpoon